Gerald Piesinger (born 16 August 1959) is a retired football defender from Austria. During his club career, Piesinger played for LASK Linz and SK Vorwärts Steyr.

External links

1959 births
Living people
Austrian footballers
Austria international footballers
Association football defenders
LASK players